Parthenos (παρθένος) is the Greek term for "virgin".

Parthenos may refer to:
Athena Parthenos
The epithet of the 3 virgin goddesses in Greek mythology
Artemis
Athena
Hestia
Virgo (constellation)
a title in Orthodox Christianity, see Virgin (title)
Virgin martyr
The Greek translation of Hebrew Almah
Perpetual virginity of Mary
Parthenos (genus), a genus of butterfly

See also
O Virgin Pure
Isaiah 7:14